Botafogo de Futebol e Regatas, commonly known as Botafogo, is a professional women's association football club based in Rio de Janeiro, Brazil. Founded in 1995, the team is affiliated with FFERJ and play their home games at Estádio Nilton Santos. The team colors, reflected in their logo and uniform, are white and black. They play in the top tier of women's football in Brazil, the Campeonato Brasileiro de Futebol Feminino, and in the Campeonato Carioca de Futebol Feminino, the first division of the traditional in-state competition.

History

Current roster

Players

Honours

 Campeonato Carioca
 Winners: 2014, 2020

References

External links
  

Association football clubs established in 1997
Women's football clubs in Brazil
1997 establishments in Brazil
women